Hidden Valley Farm is a historic home and farm complex located at Baldwin, Harford County, Maryland, United States. It consists of a mid-19th century vernacular Greek Revival brick farmhouse with several auxiliary structures. The house is a three-story, rectangular brick dwelling with a gable roof, with a two-story wing. The house features square-columned one-story porches across the façade and both sides of the wing. Also on the property are a mid-19th century barn, summer kitchen, and smokehouse, and later wood shed and garage.

Hidden Valley Farm was listed on the National Register of Historic Places in 1983.

References

External links
, including photo from 1980, Maryland Historical Trust

Farms on the National Register of Historic Places in Maryland
Houses in Harford County, Maryland
Houses completed in 1858
Greek Revival houses in Maryland
National Register of Historic Places in Harford County, Maryland